The Brooke Site (designated 33DE3) is an archaeological site in the northwestern portion of the U.S. state of Ohio. It was occupied by Late Woodland peoples of the Ontario and Younge Traditions.

Archaeology students from Defiance College took part in field schools at the site during the summers of 1968 through 1973.  Excavations conducted by these field schools resulted in the discovery of a wide range of artifacts, such as bits of flint, bone, and pottery, a midden, fire pits, and a piece of copper.  Although only half of the site was excavated by these field schools, the knowledge gained was significant because it highlighted the connection between the different peoples who occupied the site, and because the excavations revealed the inhabitants' varying seasonal uses of the site.

In 1976, the Brooke Site was added to the National Register of Historic Places because of its archaeological significance.

References

Archaeological sites in Ohio
Geography of Defiance County, Ohio
National Register of Historic Places in Defiance County, Ohio
Archaeological sites on the National Register of Historic Places in Ohio
Woodland period